Peace Iced Tea (often labeled Peace Tea) is a brand of assorted iced tea beverages produced by the Coca-Cola Company. It was originally produced by the Monster Beverage Company. The product launched on December 21, 2007. Peace Tea contains no artificial flavors or coloring, although it does contain an artificial sweetener, sucralose. The only flavor not to include sucralose was the Unsweetened Tea (also branded as High Tea), but it was discontinued in early 2012.  Peace tea is served in 23 oz cans in the United States, and 695 mL cans in Canada.

Peace Tea is also an avid competitor of Arizona brand of iced teas in the ready-to-drink beverage category, as well as drinks from Snapple and Pepsi.

The Coca-Cola Company purchased 16.7% of the Monster Beverage Company in 2015 and as a result, all non-energy drink products, including Peace Tea, were transferred to the Coca-Cola Company.

The current CEO of Peace Iced Tea is Marc Rampolla, having worked with the Coca-Cola Company for 18 years consecutively.

The Peace Symbol Inspiration
The Peace Symbol is a universal symbol for peace which was the very inspiration behind the creation of Peace Tea. "Peace Tea is whatever you want it to be," says the brand's official Web site, which is festooned with peace signs. Peace Tea "stands for social awareness while maintaining its soul. In the form of a mere liquid, it can be your own form of poetry."

Label art
The company took it upon themselves to promote their products as a form of artwork as to move away from the commercial use of the peace symbol, though the Monster logo could be found in each original design.

The original Peace Tea can designs were created by Steve Jugan (Peace Tea Brand Manager) and artist John Malloy aka FLuX in homage to the different peace movements throughout history. Mr. Malloy is a mixed-media artist who began drawing at a very young age. He later earned a background in old master's style painting and has since been self-taught in fine art, illustration, comics, and design. His illustrations have been featured in a variety of publications, including The Big Book of Contemporary Illustration and the 'Illusive 3' Book of Contemporary Illustration. His artwork led each Peace Tea packaging can to tell a story behind a significant peace movement throughout history. 

Once Peace Tea was transferred to the Coca-Cola Company in 2015, newer and more simple designs were produced.

Flavors
Razzleberry (Raspberry)
Sweet Lemon
Sno-berry (Blueberry)
Green Tea
Caddy Shack (Tea and Lemonade)
Just Peachy (Called Peach Party in Canada)
Pineapple Groove Zer-Oh
Hello Mango (Mango Green Tea)
Cheeky Cherry (Canada only)
Cheeky Cherry Fizz (Canada only)
Sweet Lemon Fizz (Canada only)
Strawberry Lemon Love (Strawberry Lemonade, Canada only)
Mango Mood

Discontinued flavors
Ceylon
Cranberry
Diet Green Tea
Pink Lemonade and Tea
Unsweetened Tea
Texas Style Sweet Tea
Strawberry Lemon Love (discontinued in US)

References 

https://www.ajc.com/business/peace-tea-eyes-future-with-coca-cola/7BLU8WkMxTQdC6dMBa5wgP/

External links
 Official website of the Hansen Beverage Company

2009 establishments in the United States
Blended tea
Coca-Cola brands
Iced tea brands